Yarijan may refer to:
 Yarijan-e Khaleseh
 Yarijan-e Olya (disambiguation)
 Yarijan-e Sofla (disambiguation)